The Men's team table tennis event at the 2014 Commonwealth Games was held from 24 July to 28 July at the Scotstoun Sports Campus in Glasgow.

Group stage

Pool A

Pool B

Pool C

Pool D

Pool E

Pool F

Pool G

Classification stage

First round

Quarterfinals

Semifinals

Final

Knockout stage

First round

Quarterfinals

Semifinals

Bronze medal

Final

References

Table tennis at the 2014 Commonwealth Games